Adam McWillie (November 7, 1821 – July 21, 1861) was a military captain in the Mexican–American War and also one for the Confederacy in the American Civil War.

Biography 
McWillie, born in Camden, South Carolina, was the son of the twenty-second Governor of Mississippi, William McWillie. He was educated at South Carolina College. Along with his father and his family, he moved to Madison County, Mississippi, in September 1845 and built "Kirkwood," the family's home. In June 1846, McWillie raised a company from Madison County to volunteer for service in the Mexican–American War. More than 17,000 Mississippians volunteered, but only 1,000 were called to serve in the First Mississippi Regiment under Colonel Jefferson Davis. In order to serve, Captain McWillie enlisted in the Mississippi Rifles as a private and fought as part of force that took Monterey in September 1846. When the Second Mississippi Regiment was formed under Reuben Davis, McWillie took command of the Camden Rifles and served out remainder of war, fighting at the Battle of Buena Vista. Following the Mexican-American War, McWillie returned to Kirkwood, where he was a planter.

In 1861 with the outbreak of the Civil War, he again raised the Camden Rifles, which became part of the 18th Mississippi Regiment under Col. E. R. Burt. The regiment arrived at Camp Walker, near Manassas, Virginia, on June 18, 1861, and, along with the 17th Mississippi and 5th South Carolina, was brigaded under Gen. David R. Jones. The brigade was on the extreme right of the Confederate army at Bull Run on July 21. Captain McWillie was killed by an enemy canister shot while rallying his command during an attack on the Union lines up Rocky Run. He was buried on the field alongside his nephew, Pvt. E.H. Anderson, who also was mortally wounded during the battle.

References 

1821 births
1861 deaths
People from Camden, South Carolina
People from Madison County, Mississippi
Confederate States Army officers
United States Army officers
People of Mississippi in the American Civil War
American military personnel of the Mexican–American War
Confederate States of America military personnel killed in the American Civil War
University of South Carolina alumni